R. J. Hackett (official number 21934) was a steamer built in 1869. When first launched, the ship's wide cross-section and long midships hold were unconventional, but the design's advantages in moving cargo through the inland lakes spawned many imitators. The Hackett is recognized as the first Great Lakes freighter, a vessel type that has dominated Great Lakes shipping for over 100 years. The wreck site was listed on the National Register of Historic Places in 1992.

Shipbuilder Elihu M. Peck
Elihu Monroe Peck (1822 – May 8, 1896) was a pioneer in shipbuilding and passenger and freight hauling. He was born in Butternuts, New York in 1822.  When Peck was 16, he began working in the profession of a ship's carpenter, moving to Cleveland, Ohio and apprenticing to shipbuilder Philo Moses.  In 1847, Peck started his own shipyard, building a single new ship (the schooner Jenny Lind), but focusing on the repair of older ships.  Peck later took a turn at captaining his own ship, the Fountain City. In 1855, Peck formed a partnership with Irvine U. Masters, beginning the firm of Peck & Masters.  The new firm focused on building new vessels.  Masters died in 1866, but Peck kept the name of the firm.

Peck married Susan Ettling Rogers of Bedford, Ohio in 1845. The couple had two children, both of whom died young. Peck also had other business interests, as president of People's Gas Light Company of Cleveland and a director of the Savings Loan Association. He was a delegate to his county Republican convention in 1855 and was elected a waterworks commissioner in 1867.

Peck had a reputation as a brusque but fair man, with a streak of unconventionality.  When work was slow, he kept his builders employed by building ships on speculation; these speculative builds were always eventually sold.  The first ship he built, schooner Jenny Lind, had a blunt bow and almost square cross-section, unlike the more conventional sleek, raked schooners of the day.  However, the Jenny Lind'''s design created more cargo space, giving the ship an advantage over competing schooners.

Building the R. J. Hackett
Most of the ships built by Peck & Masters were of a relatively conventional design, but in 1869 Peck again indulged in the unconventional. For this vessel, Peck took on an investing partner, Captain Robert J. Hackett of Detroit. They designed and built the R. J. Hackett on speculation, launching the ship on November 16, 1869. The Hackett, like the Jenny Lind, had a boxy hull, increasing cargo capacity.

However, Peck and Hackett could not find a buyer for the Hackett, and instead of keeping the ship moored, they organized the Northwest Transportation Company, along with Hackett's brother and Harvey Brown, an agent for the Jackson Iron Company. Hackett established the company headquarters in Detroit, and hired Captain David Trotter to sail the Hackett. The ship was enrolled on March 31, 1870, in Detroit, and set off on her first voyage that spring.

Description
The ship was originally powered by a  steam engine placed all the way aft connected to a propeller. An 1883 retrofit installed a  compound steeple engine. A deckhouse with galley and crew quarters sat aft above the engine room, and a second deckhouse containing the captain's cabin and a pilothouse sat near the bow of the ship. The Hackett had two masts originally (a third was added in a later retrofit) which could be set with sail or used to support block and tackle when the ship was unloading. A line of hatches on  centers granting access to the hold ran the length of the deck.

Significance of the Hackett
The design of the R. J. Hackett was innovative. With its boxy hull, hatch-lined deck, and placement of the deckhouses, the ship was ideally suited for moving cargo through inland waterways.  The fore and aft deckhouses gave the Hackett a single immense hold that could be easily accessed and filled with cargo.  The boxy hull maximized cargo volume, and the hatch spacing lined the ship up perfectly with the ore dock chutes in Marquette, Michigan and elsewhere, and the center section free of rigging made loading the ship much easier.  The forward pilothouse gave the captain better vision and quicker reaction to dangers in the water.  The Hacketts design combined the best aspects of steam and sailing ships into a new class of vessel.

The R. J. Hackett was capable of running , faster than a comparable sail-powered cargo ship. Moreover, because of her design, the ship could carry a prodigious amount of cargo. The construction of the Hackett coincided, not coincidentally, with the explosion of the iron industry in Michigan's Upper Peninsula and the corresponding jump in the need for freighters that could carry iron ore from the mines to the faraway smelters.

The success of the R. J. Hackett  immediately spawned imitators, completely altering the look of lake freighters thence forward. Over the next 25 years, freighters based on the Hackett'''s design (now called Great Lakes freighters) became the most common type of ship found on the Great Lakes. Over the next 100 years, the design of the Hackett was the basis for nearly every bulk freighter built for use on the inland waterways of North America.  Even as construction shifted to iron and steel hulls in the 1880s, the basic design of the Hackett was still followed.

Later history
In 1870, Peck added another innovation by experimenting with towing. He used the R. J. Hackett to tow the schooner Forest City (of a similar design to the Hackett but without engines), both laden with ore.  This proved the utility of towing transport ships through the lakes, effectively doubling the cargo capacity of the single ship without sacrificing maneuverability. In 1871, the Forest City was outfitted with engines to run independently (and got its own tow consort) and the Hackett towed the schooner Harvey H. Brown.

Elihu Peck gradually withdrew from shipbuilding, and dissolved his shipbuilding business in about 1872. Within a few years, he moved from Cleveland to Detroit to concentrate on Northwest Transportation Company and its freighters. Northwest eventually owned one of the largest transport fleets on the Great Lakes. Peck remained president of Northwest until his death on May 8, 1896.

In the early 1870s, the R. J. Hackett was valued at $48,000. In 1883 the engine was replaced with a steeple compound engine by the Detroit Dry Dock Engine Works. In 1889, the ship's boiler was replaced; at this time it was still valued at $50,000.

In 1892, Northwest Transportation sold the Hackett to the Vulcan Transportation Company of Detroit. In the spring of 1905, Vulcan in turn sold the ship to Captain H. C. McCallum.

Wreck
In November 1905, the Hackett was on its way from Cleveland to Marinette, Wisconsin carrying a load of coal. On the morning of November 12, a fire started in the Hacketts crew quarters.  The fire soon spread to the oil in the engine room.  Captain McCallum ran the ship aground on Whaleback Reef off Washington Island in Green Bay, and the crew of 13 escaped in the lifeboats. A nearby fishing tug picked up the crew and took them ashore. Flames from the fire were also seen by men from the nearby Plum Island Life-Saving and Light Stations, who headed for the ship. By the time they reached the Hackett, fire had consumed the aft of the ship, and soon the entire vessel was gone down to the waterline The ship at this time was valued at $20,000 but insured for only $12,000.

It consists of large sections of hull along with the steeple engine, shaft, propeller and boiler, cargo coal, and miscellaneous artifacts. The wreck site was listed on the National Register of Historic Places in 1992.

References

1869 ships
Ships built in Cleveland
Great Lakes freighters
Maritime incidents in 1905
Shipwrecks of Lake Michigan
Shipwrecks on the National Register of Historic Places in Michigan
National Register of Historic Places in Menominee County, Michigan